The British grave of the Unknown Warrior (often known as 'The Tomb of the Unknown Warrior') holds an unidentified member of the British armed forces killed on a European battlefield during the First World War. He was given a state funeral and buried in Westminster Abbey, London on 11 November 1920, simultaneously with a similar interment of a French unknown soldier at the Arc de Triomphe in France, making both graves the first examples of a tomb of the Unknown Soldier, and the first to honour the unknown dead of the First World War.

History of the Unknown Warrior

Origins

The idea of a Tomb of the Unknown Warrior was first conceived in 1916 by the Reverend David Railton, who, while serving as an army chaplain on the Western Front, had seen a grave marked by a rough cross, which bore the pencil-written legend 'An Unknown British Soldier'.

He wrote to the dean of Westminster, Herbert Ryle, in 1920 proposing that an unidentified British soldier from the battlefields in France be buried with due ceremony in Westminster Abbey "amongst the kings" to represent the many hundreds of thousands of Empire dead. The idea was strongly supported by the dean and the prime minister, David Lloyd George, who later wrote "The Cenotaph is the token of our mourning as a nation; the Grave of the Unknown Warrior is the token of our mourning as individuals".

Selection, arrival and ceremony

Arrangements were placed in the hands of Lord Curzon of Kedleston who prepared in committee the service and location. Suitable remains were exhumed from various battlefields and brought to the chapel at Saint-Pol-sur-Ternoise near Arras, France, on the night of 8 November 1920. The bodies were received by the Reverend George Kendall OBE. Brigadier L.J. Wyatt and Lieutenant Colonel E.A.S. Gell of the Directorate of Graves Registration and Enquiries went into the chapel alone. The remains were then placed in four plain coffins each covered by Union Flags: the two officers did not know from which battlefield any individual soldier had come. Brigadier Wyatt with closed eyes rested his hand on one of the coffins. The other soldiers were then taken away for reburial by Kendall.

The coffin of the unknown warrior then stayed at the chapel overnight and on the afternoon of 9 November, it was transferred under guard and escorted by Kendall, with troops lining the route, from Ste Pol to the medieval castle within the ancient citadel at Boulogne. For the occasion, the castle library was transformed into a chapelle ardente: a company from the French 8th Infantry Regiment, recently awarded the Légion d'Honneur en masse, stood vigil overnight.

The following morning, two undertakers entered the castle library and placed the coffin into a casket of the oak timbers of trees from Hampton Court Palace. The casket was banded with iron, and a 16th Century sword chosen by King George V personally from the Royal Collection was affixed to the top and surmounted by an iron shield bearing the inscription 'A British Warrior who fell in the Great War 1914–1918 for King and Country'.

The casket was then placed onto a French military wagon, drawn by six black horses. At 10:30 a.m., all the church bells of Boulogne tolled; the massed trumpets of the French cavalry and the bugles of the French infantry played Aux Champs (the French "Last Post"). Then, the mile-long procession—led by one thousand local schoolchildren and escorted by a division of French troops—made its way down to the harbour.

At the quayside, Marshal Foch saluted the casket before it was carried up the gangway of the destroyer, and piped aboard with an admiral's call. The Verdun slipped anchor just before noon and was joined by an escort of six battleships. As the flotilla carrying the casket closed on Dover Castle it received a 19-gun Field Marshal's salute. It was landed at Dover Marine Railway Station at the Western Docks on 10 November. The body of the Unknown Warrior was carried to London in South Eastern and Chatham Railway General Utility Van No.132, which had previously carried the bodies of Edith Cavell and Charles Fryatt. The van has been preserved by the Kent and East Sussex Railway. The train went to Victoria Station, where it arrived at platform 8 at 8:32 p.m. that evening and remained overnight. A plaque marking the site was unveiled on 10 November 1998: every year on the same date, a small Remembrance service, organised by The Western Front Association, takes place between platforms 8 and 9.

The Unknown Warrior was granted a full state funeral, the only time that this honour has been bestowed on an anonymous person or a representative of a whole group of people. On the morning of 11 November 1920, the casket was placed onto a gun carriage of the Royal Horse Artillery (N Battery RHA) and drawn by six black horses through immense and silent crowds. As the cortege set off, a further Field Marshal's salute was fired in Hyde Park. The route followed was Hyde Park Corner, The Mall, and to Whitehall where the Cenotaph, a "symbolic empty tomb", was unveiled by King George V. The cortège was then followed by The King, the Royal Family and ministers of state to Westminster Abbey, where the casket was borne into the West Nave of the Abbey flanked by a guard of honour of one hundred recipients of the Victoria Cross. The guests of honour were a group of about one hundred women. They had been chosen because they had each lost their husband and all their sons in the war. "Every woman so bereft who applied for a place got it".

The coffin was then interred in the far western end of the Nave, only a few feet from the entrance, in soil brought from each of the main battlefields, and covered with a silk pall. Servicemen from the armed forces stood guard as tens of thousands of mourners filed silently past. The ceremony appears to have served as a form of catharsis for collective mourning on a scale not previously known.

The grave was then capped with a black Belgian marble stone (the only tombstone in the Abbey on which it is forbidden to walk) featuring this inscription, composed by Herbert Edward Ryle, Dean of Westminster, engraved with brass from melted down wartime ammunition.

This last sentence is a paraphrase of 2 Chronicles 24:16, taken from the story of Jehoiada: "And they buried him in the city of David among the kings, because he had done good in Israel, both toward God, and toward his house."

Around the main inscription are four New Testament quotations:
 The Lord knoweth them that are his (top; 2 Timothy 2:19)
 Unknown and yet well known, dying and behold we live (side; 2 Corinthians 6:9)
 Greater love hath no man than this (side; John 15:13)
 In Christ shall all be made alive (base; 1 Corinthians 15:22)

Later history

A year later, on 17 October 1921, the unknown warrior was given the United States' highest award for valour, the Medal of Honor, from the hand of General John Pershing; it hangs on a pillar close to the tomb. On 11 November 1921, the American Unknown Soldier was reciprocally awarded the Victoria Cross.

When Elizabeth Bowes-Lyon (later Queen Elizabeth The Queen Mother) married Prince Albert, Duke of York (who became King George VI) on 26 April 1923, she laid her bouquet at the Tomb on her way into the Abbey, as a tribute to her brother Fergus who had died at the Battle of Loos in 1915 (and whose name was then listed among those of the missing on the Loos Memorial, although in 2012 a new headstone was erected in the Quarry Cemetery, Vermelles). Royal brides married at the Abbey now have their bouquets laid on the tomb the day after the wedding and all of the official wedding photographs have been taken. It is also the only tomb not to have been covered by a special red carpet for the wedding of the Duke of York and Elizabeth Bowes-Lyon.

Before she died in 2002, Queen Elizabeth The Queen Mother expressed the wish for her wreath to be placed on the Tomb of the Unknown Warrior. Her daughter, Queen Elizabeth II, laid the wreath the day after the funeral.

The British Unknown Warrior came 76th in the 100 Great Britons poll. A new steam locomotive, LMS Patriot Class 5551 The Unknown Warrior, is being constructed by a charitable project, the LMS-Patriot Project. The new locomotive is destined to be the new National Memorial Engine, continuing the Remembrance tradition of the Patriot class steam locomotive and its predecessors. A public appeal to build the locomotive was launched in 2008 and work continues today.

Heads of state from over 70 countries have lain wreaths in memoriam of the Unknown Warrior.

On the 100th anniversary of the interment, a ceremony attended by Prince Charles (later Charles III), his wife, and the then prime minister, Boris Johnson, was held at the Abbey and broadcast live to the nation by the BBC. The Poet Laureate, Simon Armitage, read a newly written poem "The Bed". Queen Elizabeth II also laid a wreath at the tomb.

Related memorials
There have been three related memorials erected since 1920 for the Unknown Warrior:
 St. Pol where the Unknown Warrior was selected
 Dover harbour at the cruise terminal where the Unknown Warrior was brought ashore
 Victoria Station, London, where the Unknown Warrior rested before his burial on 11 November

See also
 Tomb of the Unknown Soldier – includes a listing of unknown soldier memorials around the world

References

Citations

Works cited

Further reading
 The Story of the British Unknown Warrior, M. Gavaghan

External links

 The Unknown Warrior (Westminster Abbey)
 What is the Grave of the Unknown Warrior? – The Dean of Westminster Abbey, the Very Reverend Dr John Hall explains its significance
 The LMS-Patriot Project
 Hanson discusses Unknown Soldiers: The Story of the Missing of the First World War at the Pritzker Military Museum & Library

1920 in the United Kingdom
1920 sculptures
British military personnel killed in World War I
Burials at Westminster Abbey
Date of birth unknown
Military memorials in London
+United Kingdom
Tombs of Unknown Soldiers
World War I memorials in the United Kingdom